Gordon Whyte (13 August 1915 – 24 June 2007) was a New Zealand cricketer. He played in one first-class match for Wellington in 1939/40.

See also
 List of Wellington representative cricketers

References

External links
 

1915 births
2007 deaths
New Zealand cricketers
Wellington cricketers
Cricketers from Wellington City